Pio Sokobalavu is a Fijian rugby league footballer who plays for the St George Illawarra Dragons in the Intrust Super Premiership. He is a Fiji international.

Playing career
From Totoya, Sokobalavu played in the 2016 Holden Cup for the Wests Tigers. In 2017 he played for the Wests Tigers in the New South Wales Cup.

Sokobalavu was not originally selected in the Fijian squad for the 2017 World Cup, but was called in as an injury replacement. He was a reserve for Fiji in their match against Italy.

In 2018, he was selected to play for Fiji against PNG.

References

External links
2017 RLWC profile
Dragons Profile

Living people
Fijian rugby league players
Fiji national rugby league team players
1996 births
People from Totoya